Yuri Galauyevich Sekinayev (born 17 April 1962) is a Russian professional football coach and a former player.

External links
 

1962 births
Sportspeople from Vladikavkaz
Living people
Soviet footballers
Soviet expatriate footballers
Russian footballers
Russian expatriate footballers
Expatriate footballers in Czechoslovakia
Expatriate footballers in Germany
FC Spartak Vladikavkaz players
FC Chornomorets Odesa players
FC Spartak Moscow players
MŠK Žilina players
Türkiyemspor Berlin players
Russian football managers
Russian expatriate football managers
Expatriate football managers in Germany
FC Spartak Vladikavkaz managers
Russian Premier League managers
Association football midfielders